The 1912–13 Army Cadets men's ice hockey season was the 10th season of play for the program.

Season
Lt. Philip Gordon took over head coaching duties and, in his second game, led the team to its largest ever victory with a 27–0 throttling of the New York Military Academy.

Roster

Standings

Schedule and Results

|-
!colspan=12 style=";" | Regular Season

References

Army Black Knights men's ice hockey seasons
Army
Army
Army
Army